Sergio Fiorentini (29 July 1934 – 11 December 2014) was an Italian actor and voice actor.

Fiorentini was best known for his portrayal of characters in Italian crime dramas and films as well as dubbing Gene Hackman in a majority of his films and Rafiki in the Italian version of The Lion King film series.

Biography
Born in Rome, Fiorentini started his career on stage in the 1960s, and since the early 1970s he began an intense career as a character actor, being often cast in roles of inspectors, police commissioners and men in uniform in poliziotteschi and in crime films and TV-series, such as A Special Cop in Action and Distretto di Polizia. He most notably portrayed Alfio Cacciapuoti in Il maresciallo Rocca opposite Gigi Proietti.

Fiorentini was also very active as a voice actor and a dubber. He was the official Italian voice actor of Gene Hackman. This was a role he shared with his colleague Renato Mori. Other actors he dubbed included Eli Wallach and Jack Warden as well as Bill Cosby, Burt Young, Tony Burton, Max von Sydow, Tom Wilkinson, Charles Durning, Patrick McGoohan, Bud Spencer, James Doohan, Mel Brooks and he also voiced Benny Hill in the Italian dubbed version of The Benny Hill Show. In Fiorentini's animated voice roles, he dubbed Rafiki in The Lion King franchise. Other roles include Bumblelion in The Wuzzles, Alm-Onji in Heidi, Girl of the Alps and Trigger in Robin Hood.

Personal life
Fiorentini was the father of voice actor Maurizio Fiorentini (born 1963) and he was married to actress Eliana Lupo (who was 27 years younger than him) until his death in 2014.

Death
Fiorentini died in Rome after battling an illness on the evening of 11 December 2014 at the age of 80.

Filmography

Cinema
Hospitals: The White Mafia (1973)
Flatfoot (1973) – Ferramenti's Thug (voice, uncredited)
Bello come un arcangelo (1974) – Don Fernando, priest
Rome: The Other Side of Violence (1976) – Marcello
A Special Cop in Action (1976) – Mancuso
Il prefetto di ferro (1977) – Un mafioso
The Rubber Wall (1991) – Capo Stato Maggiore Aereonautica
Ostinato destino (1992)
L'angelo con la pistola (1992)
Complicazioni nella notte (1992)
A Cold, Cold Winter (1996)
La Vera Madre (1999)
Stregati dalla luna (2001) – Maresciallo
Nel mio amore (2004) – Giovanni
Taxi Lovers (2005) – Alberto
Torno a vivere da solo (2008) – Peppino
Me, Them and Lara (2009) – Albero Mascolo – padre di Carlo
All at Sea (2011) – Nonno
Teresa Manganiello. Sui passi dell'amore (2012) – Alberto Gregorini
Viva l'Italia (2012) – Cesare
A Perfect Family (2012) – Uomo cimitero
The Move of The Penguin (2013) – padre Salvatore
Il mio giorno (2015) – Matteo (posthumous release)

Television
Il maresciallo Rocca (1996–2005) – Brig. Alfio Cacciapuoti

Dubbing roles

Animation
Rafiki in The Lion King
Rafiki in The Lion King II: Simba's Pride 
Rafiki in The Lion King 1½
Rafiki in Timon & Pumbaa
Trigger in Robin Hood
Bumblelion in The Wuzzles
Narrator in Treasure Planet
General Mandible in Antz
Yar in Dinosaur
Alm-Onji in Heidi, Girl of the Alps
Shazzan in Shazzan
Julius Caesar in Asterix Conquers America
General Woundwort in Watership Down
Jarol in Fire and Ice
Br'er Bear in Song of the South (1973 redub)
Kotaro Azuma in Casshan
Count Lazare d'Cagliostro in The Castle of Cagliostro

Live action
Lex Luthor in Superman
Lex Luthor in Superman II
Lex Luthor / Voice of Nuclear Man Superman IV: The Quest for Peace
Wilfred Buckley in Power
Robert Caulfield in Narrow Margin
Colonel Jason Rhodes in Uncommon Valor
Walter Lloyd / Duncan (Duke) Potter in Target
Jedediah Tucker Ward in Class Action
Harry Zimm in Get Shorty
Kevin Keeley in The Birdcage
Jack Ames in Twilight
Edward "Brill" Lyle in Enemy of the State
Arnold Margolese in The Mexican
Jimmy McGinty in The Replacements
Joe Moore in Heist
Leslie McMahon Reigart in Behind Enemy Lines
William B. Tensy in Heartbreakers
Royal Tenenbaum in The Royal Tenenbaums
Rankin Fitch in Runaway Jury
Sam Cayhall in The Chamber
Monroe "Eagle" Cole in Welcome to Mooseport
Gene Hackman in I Knew It Was You
Ritchie Blumenthal in The Hunter
General Reser in The Domino Principle
Cesare in Eye of the Cat
Herbert Morrison in Nuts
Noah Dietrich in The Hoax
Old Man in The Ghost Writer
Leon B. Little in Tough Guys
Harry M. Rosenfeld in All the President's Men
Jackie in The Champ
Nerva in A.D.
Max Corkle in Heaven Can Wait
Julian Marx in Bullets over Broadway
Judge Francis Reyford in ...And Justice for All
Les Nichols in Tootsie
William Snyder in The Sting
Charlie in Two of a Kind
Paulie Pennino in Rocky Balboa
Mueller in The Hideout
Lou Kritski in The Super
Cosmo Castorini in Moonstruck
Frank Hull in Firepower
Benny Hill in The Benny Hill Show
Yogurt / President Skroob in Spaceballs
William J. Le Petomane / Indian Chief in Blazing Saddles
Charleston in Charleston
Moses in Troublemakers
Pepe in Killing Is My Business, Honey
Curly in The Money Pit
Paul Gray in Suspect
Randolph Duke in Trading Places
Montgomery Scott in Star Trek: The Motion Picture
Montgomery Scott in Star Trek IV: The Voyage Home
Lawrence Woodruff in Jack
Bill Cosby in Fat Albert
Kruge in Star Trek III: The Search for Spock
Terry Jones’s roles in Monty Python's The Meaning of Life
Harold Dobey in Starsky & Hutch
Curtis in The Blues Brothers
Benjamin Khaled in The Stud
General Gogol in For Your Eyes Only
Mr. MacMillan in Big
Ammon in Clash of the Titans
Mickey Goldmill in Rocky III
Dr. Constantine in Murder on the Orient Express
Odell Gardener in Evil Under the Sun
Robert Beaumont in The Ghost and the Darkness
Stanislaus Katzinsky in All Quiet on the Western Front
Rolling Star in Blueberry
Toht in Indiana Jones and the Raiders of the Lost Ark
Leon Kowalski in Blade Runner
King Edward Longshanks in Braveheart
Shaman in Indiana Jones and the Temple of Doom
Rogers in Brubaker
Ben Luckett in Cocoon
Sam Stone in Ruthless People
Hollis Peaker in Capricorn One
Jeffrey "The Big" Lebowski in The Big Lebowski
Michael Hughes in Meteor
Jack Cartwright in The Sea Wolves
Judge Atkins in Kramer vs. Kramer
Carroll "Toddy" Todd in Victor/Victoria
Irving Finegarten in S.O.B.
Mr. Choudhury in Death on the Nile
Baron Vladimir Harkonnen in Dune
Barney in The Pope of Greenwich Village
President of the United States in Armageddon
President of the United States in The Rock
John Bigalow in Raise the Titanic
Dr. Ross in Splash

References

External links
 
 
 

1934 births
2014 deaths
Male actors from Rome
Italian male film actors
Italian male stage actors
Italian male television actors
Italian male voice actors
Italian voice directors
20th-century Italian male actors
21st-century Italian male actors